Waqa may refer to:

Barina Waqa, Nauruan lawyer and civil servant
Baron Waqa (b. 1959), Nauruan politician
Sisa Waqa, Fijian rugby league footballer
Stanley Waqa, Fijian rugby league footballer
WAQA-LP, American radio station
Western Australian Quidditch Association, The governing body for the sport of Quidditch in Western Australia